Frederick Fales Richardson (August 2, 1918 – July 9, 1983) was an American cricketer who played 11 first-class matches for the Madras provincial cricket team.

Early life 

Frederick Richardson was born in Brookland, Pennsylvania on August 2, 1918. At the age of two, Richardson migrated with his parents to England where he did his schooling at Westminster School and graduated from Princeton University. Frederick Richardson moved to Calcutta, India in 1941 and worked for Stanvac (Standard Vacuum). In 1944, Richardson migrated to Madras and then to Bombay, where he died in 1983.

Sporting career 

Frederick Richardson learned cricket during his school days in England. He played for the Madras cricket team under the captaincy of C. P. Johnstone from 1944 to 1948. He also played football during his three-year stay in Calcutta.

References 

 
 

1918 births
1983 deaths
Tamil Nadu cricketers
American cricketers
Europeans cricketers
Cricketers from Pennsylvania